Greenleaf is an unincorporated census-designated place in Brown County, Wisconsin, United States, in the town of Wrightstown.

History
As of the 2010 census it had a population of 607. Greenleaf was named for Emery B. Greenleaf, the general manager of the Milwaukee & Northern railroad at the time the Greenleaf post office was established in 1873.

Incorporation as a Village
In 2020, 800 residents of the community petitioned the state of Wisconsin to become a village. The Wisconsin Incorporation Review Board denied the petition's "characteristics of the territory" requirement as the petition included 2 separate areas: one in the vicinity of a roundabout of state highways WIS 57 and Wisconsin Highway 96 and another isolated area to the east of the Niagara Escarpment. The second area is isolated from the first by the escarpment, a quarry and vacant lands.

A revised proposal was approved on April 13, 2022.

Geography
It is located at the intersection of Wisconsin Highways 57/32 and 96. It uses ZIP code 54126. The community is part of the Green Bay Metropolitan Statistical Area.

References

Images

Census-designated places in Brown County, Wisconsin
Greenleaf
Green Bay metropolitan area